Hagbyån is a river in Sweden, in eastern Småland.

References

Rivers of Kalmar County